John Malam is a British historian, archaeologist, and author of Children's non-fiction (informational) books.

Background 

He was born in Wolverhampton, England, and attended the University of Birmingham where he received a degree in Ancient History and Archaeology. He excavated at sites in the UK, and headed the archaeology unit at the Ironbridge Gorge Museum Trust, Shropshire. Thereafter, he worked as an editor for UK publishing companies before becoming a full-time author. His informational books for children cover a range of subjects, with a particular emphasis on ancient civilizations. He lives in Cheshire, north-west England.

See also

  List of children's non-fiction writers

References

External links
  John Malam's website

British non-fiction writers
British children's writers
Living people
writers from Wolverhampton
Alumni of the University of Birmingham
British male writers
Year of birth missing (living people)
Male non-fiction writers